Barrandov Bridge (Czech: Barrandovský most) is a road bridge over the Vltava river in Prague, the Czech Republic. It is the most frequented road in the whole country, over 136 000 cars ride over it daily. It connects Braník (Prague 4) and Hlubočepy (Prague 5) (Barrandov) districts. The south part was built in 1983 and the north part in 1988. The brutalist bridge was designed by Karel Filsak, sculptures by Josef Klimeš.

Gallery

External links 
 

Brutalist architecture in the Czech Republic
Bridges over the Vltava
Bridges in Prague
Prague 4
Concrete bridges
Girder bridges
Bridges completed in 1988